Trans Misja is the fourth studio album by Polish pop/dance singer Reni Jusis. The album was produced by Jusis and Michał Przytuła, who also worked on Elektrenika in 2001. They wrote most of the songs while English lyrics were written by S. Magassouba and M. Demucha. Trans Misja is a reminder of electropop of the 1970s and 1980s. The album contains the hit single, "Kiedyś cię znajdę", which brought the singer back on charts and is regarded her most famous song next to "Zakręcona", her first hit from 1998.

Trans Misja was well-received peaking at #4 on Polish Album Chart. Album met positive critics reception. It won a Fryderyk Award (Polish Grammy) in category Album Roku Dance/Electronika/Muzyka Klubowa (Album of the Year Dance/Electronic/Club) and was nominated to Song of the Year and Record of the Year for Kiedyś cię znajdę. A year later It's Not Enough was nominated for Video of the Year.

OLiS
Trans Misja debuted on #29 position of Polish Album Chart and rising to #13 the following week. It reached its peak three weeks after release reaching #4. In total, it spent 24 weeks on the chart.

Track listing
"Wynurzam się" – 9:05
"Kiedyś cię znajdę" – 5:44
"Raczej inaczej" – 5:27
"Let's play pink ping-pong" – 3:49
"Ostatni raz (nim zniknę)" - 4:56
"Kto pokocha?" - 5:09
"It's not enough" - 4:07 
"Jeśli zostaniesz..." - 5:45 
"W zwolnionym tempie" - 5:27
"Not real (cyber girl nr 6)" - 5:21
"Trans misja" - 5:23

Singles
Kiedyś Cię Znajdę
Ostatni Raz (Nim Zniknę)
It's Not Enough
Let's Play Pink Ping-Pong

2003 albums
Reni Jusis albums